HMS Scarborough was a Whitby-class or Type 12 anti-submarine frigate of the Royal Navy of the United Kingdom. She was named after the town of Scarborough in the county of North Yorkshire.

Operational Service

On commissioning in May 1957, Scarborough joined the 5th Frigate Squadron, and was the leader of the squadron in March 1959 when she took part in "Navy Days" in Portsmouth. Between 1959 and 1961 she was commanded by Józef Bartosik and between 1961 and 1962 by P W Buchanan.

She underwent an extended refit at Portsmouth from December 1962 to February 1964.

References

Publications

 Marriott, Leo, 1983.  Royal Navy Frigates 1945-1983, Ian Allan Ltd, Surrey.

 

Whitby-class frigates
Ships built on the River Tyne
1955 ships
Ships built by Vickers Armstrong